Ocean Beach is the fourth studio album by Red House Painters, released in 1995 by 4AD. The album saw the group and Mark Kozelek move toward a more pastoral and folk-influenced arrangement style, in contrast to the lengthy, droning epics that featured on their early albums. Ocean Beach was also the last album to feature founding guitarist Gorden Mack, as well as being the band's last studio album released by 4AD. The album features an unlisted hidden track, referred to as "Brockwell Park (Part 2)" less than 20 seconds after "Drop" ends. The double 10" vinyl release of the album (now long out of print) features the band's acoustic cover of Yes' 1971 hit "Long Distance Runaround." Kozelek would go on to record another version of the song (with electric guitars and an extended outro) for Red House Painters' next album, Songs for a Blue Guitar.

A rarely seen music video shot on 16mm film was directed by Matt Amato for the song "Summer Dress." The video was filmed aboard a vintage street car and at the historic Victoria Theater in San Francisco's Mission District.

An original idea for the album's front cover artwork was a photo of what could be broken pews in an abandoned church, or old beds in an abandoned hospital ward.

Reception

Caspar Smith of Select gave the album a rating of four out of five, stating that Kozelek "is right up there among the new breed of rootsy singer-songwriters".

Ocean Beach was ranked number 58 by Pitchfork in their original 1999 list of the Top 100 Albums of the 1990s.

Track listing

Double 10" vinyl release

Release history

Notes
 Additional musicians: Dan Barbee and Carrie Bradley.
 Recorded and mixed at Coast Recorders, San Francisco.
 Additional recording at Hyde Street Studios, San Francisco; and David Wellhousen's Studio, San Francisco.
 Art direction and design by Paul McMenamin at v23.
 Photography by Melodie McDaniel.

"Summer Dress" single
Although no commercial singles were ever released from the album, a promotional-only CD was issued for "Summer Dress" in the US in April 1995. The single features an exclusive radio edit of "San Geronimo."

Warner Bros./4AD, PRO-CD-7474:
 "Summer Dress – 2:52
 "San Geronimo" (Edit) – 5:03

References

Red House Painters albums
1995 albums
4AD albums
Albums produced by Mark Kozelek